The 2006 Central American Junior and Youth Championships in Athletics were held at the Estadio Cementos Progreso in Ciudad de Guatemala, Guatemala, between May 11–13, 2006. Organized by the Central American Isthmus Athletic Confederation (CADICA), it was the 19th edition of the Junior (U-20) and the 14th edition of the Youth (U-18) competition. A total of 80 events were contested, 41 by boys and 39 by girls.

Medal summary
Complete results can be found on the CADICA webpage.  Records were compiled from the results of the 2007 championships.

Junior men

Junior women

Youth boys

Youth girls

Medal table (unofficial)

Team trophies
The placing table for team trophy awarded to the 1st place overall team (boys and girls categories) was published.

Overall

Participation
The number of athletes of some teams participating in the event was reported.

 (53)

 (39)
 Panamá (15)

References

 
Central American Junior
Central American Junior
2006 in Central American sport
International athletics competitions hosted by Guatemala
2006 in youth sport